Figure & Spirit is an album by American jazz saxophonist Lee Konitz recorded in 1976 and released on the Progressive label.

Critical reception

Scott Yanow on Allmusic said "although there are a few minor mistakes, the music is quite exciting and spontaneous. Brown was the best possible substitute for Warne Marsh (Konitz's original choice for the record) and sounds in prime form. It's worth acquiring by fans of straight-ahead jazz".

Track listing 
All compositions by Lee Konitz except where noted.
 "Figure and Spirit" - 6:50
 "Dream Stepper" - 8:19
 "Smog Eyes" (Ted Brown) - 7:25
 "April" (Lennie Tristano) - 10:05
 "Without You Man" - 5:22
 "Dig It" (Brown) - 4:46
 "Feather Bed" (Brown) - 7:04 Bonus track on CD reissue

Personnel 
Lee Konitz - alto saxophone, soprano saxophone
Ted Brown - tenor saxophone
Albert Dailey - piano 
Rufus Reid - bass
Joe Chambers - drums

References 

Lee Konitz albums
1977 albums
Progressive Records albums